Imam Baksh Lone (1883-1977) was an Indian wrestler and a practitioner of the Indian wrestling style of Pehlwani. Imam was also the brother of Ghulam "The Great Gama" Muhammad Lone. Imam had arrived in England by April, 1910, along with fellow wrestlers from India, including his brother Ghulam Muhammad, Ahmed Bux, and Gamu, to participate in European catch wrestling tournaments. 

Health and Strength magazine announced "The Invasion of the Indian Wrestlers" in its 14 May 1910, issue. The members of the Indian group were listed as Gama, Champion of India; Imam Baksh, Champion of Lahore; Ahmed Baksh, Champion of Amritsar; and Gamu, Champion of Jalandhar.

Imam Baksh wrestled Swiss champion John Lemm during his career. The match between Baksh and Lemm ended with Baksh defeating the Swiss champion.

In 1918, Gama Ghulam Muhammad, in a major tournament at Kolhapur, passed his title of Indian Champion to Imam Bux, who had thrown Rahim Sultaniwala in 20 minutes.

Imam Baksh was reportedly a superior ground wrestler compared to Ghulam Muhammad. Henry Werner had written that letter saying that Imam Bux would have been a better opponent for Stanislaus Zbyszko than for Gama. The editor of Health and Strength wrote that, "in my opinion, he [Gama] is not quite so clever a wrestler as his brother, Imam Bux, who enjoys the advantage of a longer reach."

By the mid-1940s, Gama continued to put out challenges but added a stipulation. The stipulation was that anyone who wanted to wrestle the great Gama had to wrestle and defeat Imam first. No one did.

References

External links
The Lion of the Punjab – Gama in England, 1910 by Graham Noble
The Lion of the Punjab – Part III: London, 1910 by Graham Noble
The Lion of the Punjab – Part IV: Aftermath by Graham Noble

Further reading
 Lahore: A Memoir By Muḥammad Saʻīd. Published 1989, Vanguard Books. .

1883 births
1977 deaths
20th-century professional wrestlers
Pakistani people of Kashmiri descent
Indian male professional wrestlers
People associated with physical culture